Donald S. Sanford (March 17, 1918 – February 8, 2011) was an American television, radio and film screenwriter. Sanford was known for his work on numerous television series, as well as his role as the author of the screenplay for the 1976 World War II film Midway, starring Charlton Heston and Henry Fonda, which became a cult classic.

Biography
Sanford was born March 17, 1918.  He served as a chief sonar soundman in the United States Navy from 1942 to 1945 during World War II.

Sanford began his career, initially in radio and television, after leaving the U.S. Navy. He began writing for the radio series Martin Kane, Private Eye, during the early 1950s. Sanford segued to television in the 1950s, and his professional credits ultimately included episodes of The Plainclothesman, Gunsmoke, Bonanza, Dr. Kildare, Letter to Loretta, Perry Mason, The Outer Limits, Blue Light, and The Silent Force, among others.

Sanford's film screenplay credits during the 1960s included three feature films set during the World War II era: Submarine X-1, The Thousand Plane Raid, and Mosquito Squadron, all of which were released in 1969. However, Sanford's best-known screenplay was for the 1976 World War II film Midway, which was directed by Jack Smight and starred Charlton Heston.

Sanford's last screenwriting credit before his retirement was for the 1979 sci-fi film Ravagers. He later became chief executive officer of Stansbury, Inc., a mining company specializing in vermiculite. He remained active in the screenwriting industry, serving on the Pension and Health Finance Committee for the Writers Guild of American Pension and Health Fund. Sanford was also a full member of the Academy of Motion Picture Arts and Sciences and the Writers Guild of America.

Donald S. Sanford died at a hospital in Atlanta, Georgia, on February 8, 2011, at the age of 92. He was survived by his wife of 35 years, Teddi, and his three stepchildren, Jennifer Levison, Daniel Levison, and Michael Levison.

References

External links

1918 births
2011 deaths
American male screenwriters
American television writers
United States Navy personnel of World War II
American male television writers
United States Navy sailors